Vineyard Sound is the stretch of the Atlantic Ocean which separates the Elizabeth Islands and the southwestern part of Cape Cod from the island of Martha's Vineyard, located offshore from the state of Massachusetts in the United States. To the west, it joins Rhode Island Sound, and on its eastern end it connects to Nantucket Sound.

Vineyard Sound holds some of the largest summer flounder in Massachusetts.

References

Bodies of water of Dukes County, Massachusetts
Geography of Martha's Vineyard
Sounds of Massachusetts